Burg-Sankt Michaelisdonn is an Amt ("collective municipality") in the district of Dithmarschen, in Schleswig-Holstein, Germany. Its seat is in Burg. It was formed on 1 January 2008 from the former Ämter Kirchspielslandgemeinde Burg-Süderhastedt and Kirchspielslandgemeinde Eddelak-Sankt Michaelisdonn.

The Amt Burg-Sankt Michaelisdonn consists of the following municipalities (with population in 2005):

 Averlak (640)
 Brickeln (212)
 Buchholz (1.115)
 Burg Dith. (4.364)
 Dingen (714)
 Eddelak (1.462)
 Eggstedt (836)
 Frestedt (401)
 Großenrade (529)
 Hochdonn (1.249)
 Kuden (664)
 Quickborn (199)
 Sankt Michaelisdonn (3.728)
 Süderhastedt (874)

Ämter in Schleswig-Holstein